The men's tournament of Ice hockey at the 2003 Asian Winter Games at Hachinohe, Japan, was held from 2 February to 7 February 2003.

Results
All times are Japan Standard Time (UTC+09:00)

Preliminary round

Group A

Group B

5th/6th match

Final round

Semifinals

3rd/4th match

Final

Final standing

References

External links
Official website
JIHF

Men